Purple is one of the least used colours in vexillology and heraldry. Currently, the colour appears in only three national flags: that of Dominica, El Salvador, and Nicaragua, and one co-official national flag, the Wiphala (co-official national flag of Bolivia). However, it is also present in the flags of several administrative subdivisions around the world, as well as flags of political and ethnic groups and sexual minorities.

Background 
In the past, purple dye was very expensive to produce, with the first compound used as one, Tyrian purple, being made from the mucus of a family of sea snail found only in the eastern Mediterranean and off Mogador Island near Morocco. To produce small amounts of it, it was required to obtain the mucus of thousands of snails, which was extremely labor-intensive. As such, it remained extremely expensive to use the dye, which resulted in it having almost no presence in flags and gaining the reputation as the colour of nobility and royalty, as they were the only groups able to readily afford it. In Asia, the main dye used was Han purple, although it more closely resembles indigo.

During Medieval Ages, in Europe, the colour was used in the standard of the Kingdom of León, during the reign of Alfonso VII, and in the royal standard of the Kingdom of Castile. Both states united in 1230, forming the Crown of Castile, which continued to use the combination of their flags until 1715. In South America, during the Pre-Columbian era, the Wiphala, flags used by the subdivisions of the Inca Empire, contained purple colour.

In modern era, synthetic purple dyes became easier to obtain, and flags with purple colour began being used more commonly. In 1931, the Second Spanish Republic established a tricolour flag consisting of red, yellow and purple stripes as its national flag, seeing use in Spain until 1939 and by the Spanish Republican government in exile until 1977. The flag is still sometimes used by supporters of republicanism in Spain. 

Currently, the colour appears in only three national flags: that of Dominica, El Salvador, and Nicaragua, and one co-official national flag, the Wiphala, (co-official national flag of Bolivia). However, it is present in the flags of several administrative subdivisions around the world.

National flags

Current

Historical

Subdivisional flags

Current

Historical

Other flags

City flags

Current

Historical

LGBT flags

Political flags

See also 
 List of flags by color

References 

purple
purple